Venetia is an unincorporated community in Peters Township, Washington County, Pennsylvania, United States. It has a post office with the ZIP code 15367, covering most of the area between McMurray and Gastonville.
The population of this area was 8,731 at the 2010 census. It is part of the Pittsburgh metropolitan area.

It was listed as the ZIP code in Western Pennsylvania with highest median household income in 2016 data.

References

Unincorporated communities in Washington County, Pennsylvania
Unincorporated communities in Pennsylvania